Active was a wooden ketch that was wrecked on 19 January 1898 on the Oyster Bank at the entrance of Newcastle Harbour, New South Wales, Australia, near the previously wrecked schooner Colonist while carrying a cargo of ironbark to Morpeth, New South Wales, under the command of Captain P. Williams. There were no casualties but the ship was lost.

References

Further reading 
Online databases
Australian National Shipwreck Database
Australian Shipping - Arrivals and Departures 1788-1968 including shipwrecks 
Encyclopaedia of Australian Shipwrecks - New South Wales Shipwrecks 

Books
Wrecks on the New South Wales Coast. By Loney, J. K. (Jack Kenneth), 1925–1995 Oceans Enterprises. 1993 . 
Australian Shipwrecks - Vol.1 1622-1850, Charles Bateson, AH and AW Reed, Sydney, 1972, Call number 910.4530994 BAT 
Australian shipwrecks Vol. 2 1851–1871 By Loney, J. K. (Jack Kenneth), 1925–1995. Sydney. Reed, 1980 910.4530994 LON
Australian shipwrecks Vol. 3 1871–1900 By Loney, J. K. (Jack Kenneth), 1925–1995. Geelong Vic: List Publishing, 1982 910.4530994 LON
Australian shipwrecks Vol. 4 1901–1986 By Loney, J. K. (Jack Kenneth),  1925–1995. Portarlington Vic. Marine History Publications, 1987 910.4530994 LON
Australian shipwrecks Vol. 5 Update 1986 By Loney, J. K. (Jack Kenneth),  1925–1995. Portarlington Vic. Marine History Publications, 1991 910.4530994 LON

Shipwrecks of the Hunter Region
Ships built in New South Wales
1877 ships
Maritime incidents in 1898
1871–1900 ships of Australia
Merchant ships of Australia
History of Newcastle, New South Wales